Dobrun is a rural locality (a selo) in Suzemsky District of Bryansk Oblast, Russia, located  northwest of Sevsk.

History
The village was first mentioned in the cadastres Svensk monastery near 1595 as the existing settlement. Dobrynichi. On January 25 (February 4), 1605 near the village of was a major battle troops led by Prince FI Mstsislauye with an army of False Dmitriy I (known as the Battle of Dobrynichi), after which in the vicinity of the village for centuries preserved burial mounds (Kurgan) with fraternal burials.

Until the end of the 18th century palace had possession. In the 19th century the village had a distillery.

References

External links
Unofficial website of Dobrun 

Rural localities in Suzemsky District